Read or Die is an OVA based on the manga of the same name by Hideyuki Kurata. It was created by Studio Deen in early 2001 and distributed outside Japan by Manga Entertainment in 2003. The series, directed by Koji Masunari, features the main characters of the original manga such as Yomiko Readman and Joker. It is a continuation of the manga storyline, taking place a few years after the events of the manga.

Story
The first episode begins with a cold open, set in Washington DC, where the White House has been evacuated.  The samurai Gennai Hiraga appears on top of the White House and annihilates it using a mysterious power.  Later in the episode, it is revealed that the US Library of Congress has been attacked, although this is not actually shown.

Meanwhile, in Tokyo, Yomiko Readman gets her hands on an ultra-rare German first edition book, "die Unsterbliche Liebe" (or "The Undying Love"). The book is dusty and dirty, but has sheet music handwritten in its pages, in the margins and on the blank pages in the back and front. Almost immediately she is attacked by a superhuman-like clone of Jean Henri Fabre riding a giant mecha grasshopper. He tries to steal her book, but she fights back and wins, exhibiting a superhuman ability to manipulate paper.  A man in a suit walks up to her moments later, asking "The Paper" to accompany him.  We learn that Yomiko is an agent of the British Library special operations division, a group tasked to locating and protecting rare books worldwide.

A Library team, consisting of Yomiko and American operative Drake Anderson, is sent to investigate the attack at the US Library of Congress.  Upon arriving to New York City, Drake and Yomiko meet fellow agent Nancy Makuhari (a.k.a. "Miss Deep"), who also turns out to have been sent by Joker to investigate.  Yomiko and Nancy are assigned to work together, and various comic moments occur throughout the series as personality clashes occur between Nancy's suave, femme fatale character and Yomiko's extreme bibliomania and her meek, childlike demeanor.  During the investigation, the three Library agents foil another attempt to steal the book, this one perpetrated by a clone of Otto Lilienthal.

In London, Joker and the British Library staff uncovers evidence that someone has created various super-powered clones (or "I-Jin") of famous historical figures.  The I-Jin, led by a clone of Ikkyu Soujun, are trying to steal the sheet music in Yomiko's book to reconstruct Ludwig van Beethoven's supposedly lost "Death Symphony," which causes anyone who hears it to commit suicide. The symphony figures in a plot to eliminate most of humankind, which Ikkyu sees as foolish, selfish and generally unworthy of life.

The Library team discovers that the I-Jin have built a rocket which, when launched, will play the supposed "Death Symphony" over worldwide radio frequencies.  A fleet of US Navy ships are ordered to destroy the base, which is in the middle of the Pacific Ocean, but the warships are sunk by the base's weapons.  Nancy is revealed to be a double agent, and escapes to the I-Jin Base. Yomiko becomes bent on finding her, even though she turned on the Library Team, but she is taken hostage herself by none other than Nancy, revealing that she is an I-Jin clone of Mata Hari.  Yomiko is imprisoned in a machine room within the I-Jin base, but when Ikkyu asks her to join the I-Jin, she refuses.  Ikkyu reveals his plans to Yomiko, and then seemingly kills Nancy before her eyes.  As Yomiko watches in horror, another Nancy steps out of the shadows and kisses Ikkyu passionately. The lovers depart, leaving Yomiko to die in the rapidly flooding room.

As Yomiko struggles to free herself from Ikkyu's trap and Drake battles the I-Jin versions of Fabre and Hiraga, Ikkyu's Nancy is confronted by the Library's Nancy, who survived Ikkyu's attack. The clones fight each other, ending with one Nancy floating faceup in the water at the bottom of the launch platform. The rocket launches with Yomiko, Ikkyu and the surviving Nancy aboard.  As Beethoven is about to play the Death Symphony, Ikkyu gloats over his Nancy's defeat of the Library's Nancy, but she suddenly turns on him and kills him. When he dies, she reveals that she was able to pose as her clone by switching her gun from her left hand to her right. Yomiko destroys the strings of the organ as British and American forces seize the I-Jin fortress. Yomiko plans to evacuate them both from the rocket using her book as a parachute, but at the last second Nancy does not jump, preferring to stay behind on the rocket (as she says to the dead Ikkyu, "You were a cold, heartless bastard... but even you don't deserve to die alone."). The OVA ends with Yomiko visiting Nancy's "little sister" in a secure nursing facility. She has lost most of her memory due to brain damage caused by oxygen deprivation, and asks Yomiko to tell her about her "older sister."

Characters

British Library staff
 Yomiko Readman
 
 Codenamed "The Paper" (or "Agent Paper" in the English dub), Yomiko Readman is the story's main character working for the British Library's Special Operations Division. She has the super-natural ability to control paper.  Outside of the Library she is a substitute schoolteacher.  Yomiko is a bibliomaniac with a somewhat meek, childlike demeanor who prefers to retreat into reading wherever she can.  She resides in Jinbōchō, Tokyo where she frequently buys tons of books.  Despite being half-British, Kimberly Yates does the dub for her in an American accent in the OVA.

 Nancy Makuhari
 
 Codenamed "Miss Deep", Nancy also works for the British Library.  She is a slick, suave, femme fatale type character (which ends up becoming a personality clash with Yomiko) who has the special ability to pass through solid objects by absorbing herself, hence the codename "Deep".  She says that she doesn't like her codename, as it "makes her sound like a porn star".  She is actually revealed to be created as the first of the two I-Jin based upon Mata Hari.

 Drake Anderson
 
 Drake is an archetypal tough, no-nonsense experienced American soldier.  A veteran of the American Special Forces, Drake now works in the Special Operations Division as a field support operative.  Drake has a young daughter Maggie (who is not actually seen in the anime) whom he loves very much, and it is reflected upon his soft spot for children.

 Joe Carpenter
 
 Joseph Carpenter, also known as "Joker," is the chief director and president of the British Library and its Special Operations Division. He is the boss of Yomiko Readman as well as other agents, including his rather clumsy assistant, Wendy Earhart.  He represents a stereotypical posh Englishman and is somewhat calm and collected.  Joker actually created the I-Jin program to fulfill a mysterious need not covered in the OVA, however the I-Jin run free out of Joker's control.

 Wendy Earhart
 
 Wendy is a young British woman in training to be an agent for Special Operations.  She serves as Joker's secretary and personal assistant who retrieves knowledge for him.  She is somewhat clumsy but devoted and enthusiastic as well as cares for Yomiko.

Historical figures used in the OVA
Gennai Hiraga was the original figure who destroyed the White House and appears multiple times throughout the series.  He unleashes a mysterious power in the form of green lightning bolts which is used in the series to cut the entire electricity supply of New York City, disable aircraft and destroy buildings in Washington DC.  In the final episode at the I-Jin fortress, Yomiko and Gennai engage in a sword fight, using a paper sword and  a lightsaber-type weapon respectively.  He dies when Yomiko uses a $100 bill to rupture a liquid nitrogen coolant line, whereupon he is frozen solid and shattered.
Jean Henri Fabre first appears in the beginning of the first episode, when he attempts to steal the "Immortal Beloved."  He rides a giant mechanical grasshopper and can control bees and other insects to use as weapons.  Like the insects he studied, juvenile Fabres are shown moulting from one form to another, growing from child to adult in a few days.  Two Fabres are shown in the series; the first Fabre apparently dies by crashing into a Tokyo office building, but actually moulted and escaped, taking the form of a child until he fights and is killed by Drake Anderson within the I-Jin base.
Mata Hari, a First World War spy, is the basis for Nancy Makuhari. When Nancy began to work for the British Library Special Operations, Ikkyu created an exact clone of the Nancy in every way except the fact she uses her left hand. The only surviving I-Jin with no memory of her actions after Nancy nearly killed her, Mata Hari plays a role in the TV series.
Otto Lilienthal, also known as the "Glider King", appears in the first episode where he snatches Yomiko's book while she is in the Library of Congress.  The Library team chases him to New York City, where Yomiko builds a giant paper airplane to engage Lilienthal in aerial combat.  Yomiko and Nancy defeat him by attaching a paper grappling hook to his glider, which then crashes into the Statue of Liberty.
Genjo Sanzo appears in India, where he splits the water in a river to reveal submerged buildings.  He wields an extensible staff, breathes fire, and can fly by floating on clouds.  During the showdown, he manages to severely wound Nancy, but is defeated when an enraged Yomiko hurls thousands of index cards at him.  He survives long enough to give Yomiko's book to Jean-Henri Fabre, but is then killed by Ikkyu Soujun.
Stephen Wilcox appears in the third episode on the I-Jin fortress, making a minor appearance as the builder of many of the I-Jin machinery, including Otto Lilienthal's Glider, Genjō-sanzō's heart mechanism (never directly stated, but very likely), and the I-Jin Fortress itself, which appears to be steam powered instead of, or in addition to, nuclear powered as Joker implies (nuclear power plants use steam heated by a reactor, so they are not mutually exclusive). He is portrayed as being built into the Fortress and visibly insane.  He is killed with Jean-Henri Fabre by Drake Anderson.
Ikkyu Soujun is the leader of the I-Jin, and first appears in the second episode. He is romantically involved with Mata Hari/Nancy; creating a clone of her to serve as a spy to pose as her within the British Library's special operations team. He dies at the hands of Nancy aboard the rocket at the end of the series.
Ludwig van Beethoven appears in the final episode, when he is sent off in Ikkyu's rocket to play his "Death Symphony" at an altitude where it can be heard worldwide.  His fate is unknown after Yomiko cuts the strings of the organ, but it is assumed he dies in the crash of the rocket.

TV series

The OVA was sequelled by the 26-episode TV series R.O.D the TV. The TV series is loosely connected to the OVA, and some events in the series are related.  The series takes place five years after the OVA, and in the interim Yomiko had apparently "gone missing" while her friend and student Nenene Sumiregawa (who placed Post-it notes all over her apartment in the beginning of the OVA) has been looking for her.

Yomiko, Drake, Joker and Wendy all appear in the TV series, however, most of them change somehow in appearance or character significantly.  Joker displays signs of aging, and Wendy is more mature and serious in the TV series.  Because Yomiko is actually voiced by a British person in the TV series, she actually adopts a British accent. She also develops a slightly more sensible character.

In episode 18 of R.O.D the TV, following an incident involving Nancy, Yomiko reveals the sequence of events within the five-year interval between the events of the OVA and TV series.  During the OVA, Nancy and Ikkyu were passionate lovers, and Nancy's clone was created by Ikkyu as a result of the original Nancy working for the British Library Special Operations.  Prior to Ikkyu's death in the final scenes of the OVA, Ikkyu impregnated Nancy's clone, and following the end of the OVA, Nancy's clone gives birth.  Almost immediately, Joker seizes Nancy's baby from her for "research purposes".  However, it's revealed that Joker had a specific purpose for the baby.  As the head of the British Library neared his death, Joker would attempt to transfer him into a new host body.  Yomiko attempted to stop Joker for ethical purposes, and Joker ordered to have her arrested. In a fit of despair at the sight of her ex-lover Donnie Nakajima, Yomiko burned down the British Library and went into hiding for five years, before finally reappearing in R.O.D the TV.

References

External links
Official website 
Animax's official website 
Aniplex USA's official Read or Die/ROD the TV website
Madman release details

Animerica review

2001 anime OVAs
Action anime and manga
Espionage in anime and manga
R.O.D
Thriller anime and manga
Studio Deen
Anime film and television articles using incorrect naming style